To the Islands is a 1958 novel by Australian author Randolph Stow. It won the Miles Franklin Award for 1958 and the ALS Gold Medal in 1959.

Plot summary
The novel is set in a remote Anglican mission in the Kimberley in the far north of Western Australia.

The protagonist is Heriot - based partially on the figure of Ernest Gribble - the principal chaplain of the mission, who commits an act of violence against an Aboriginal man, and who subsequently disappears into the wilderness.

Publication history
Originally published in England in 1958, and the USA in 1959, the novel was the first novel published by Penguin Australia in 1962. A revised edition appeared in 1981 published by Angus and Robertson. Audio book editions appeared in the 2000s.  Text Publishing, in its republishing Australian novels, produced their edition in 2015.

Reviews
On the novel's re-issue in 2014, Suzie Gibson in The Conversation stated that "Although Stow’s novel presents us with challenging social, political and historical issues, it was never denied literary merit. Indeed the power of Stow’s prose is the equal of anyone’s from Patrick White to Christina Stead; it is exquisite in its sparseness, precision and surprising beauty. The frankness and difficulty of the subject matter is counter-balanced by the splendour of Stow’s memorable turns of phrase."

Awards and nominations
 1958 - winner Miles Franklin Award
 1959 - winner ALS Gold Medal

References

External links
Middlemiss.org
Tom Shapcott review from Australian Book Review
Review from Australian Public Intellectual Network

1958 Australian novels
Miles Franklin Award-winning works
Novels set in Western Australia
ALS Gold Medal winning works
Randolph Stow